Nadcap (formerly NADCAP, the National Aerospace and Defense Contractors Accreditation Program) is a global cooperative accreditation program for aerospace engineering, defense and related industries.

History of Nadcap
The Nadcap program is administered by the Performance Review Institute (PRI). Nadcap was established in 1990 by SAE International. Nadcap's membership consists of "prime contractors" who coordinate with aerospace accredited suppliers to develop industry-wide audit criteria for special processes and products. Through PRI, Nadcap provides independent certification of manufacturing processes for the industry. PRI has its headquarters in Warrendale, Pennsylvania with branch offices for Nadcap located in London, Beijing, and Nagoya.

Fields of Nadcap activities
The Nadcap program provides accreditation for special processes in the aerospace and defense industry.

These include:
 Aerospace Quality Systems (AQS)
 Aero Structure Assembly (ASA)
 Chemical Processing (CP)
 Coatings (CT)
 Composites (COMP)
 Conventional Machining as a Special Process (CMSP)
 Elastomer Seals (SEAL)
 Electronics (ETG)
 Fluids Distribution (FLU)
 Heat Treating (HT)
 Materials Testing Laboratories (MTL)
 Measurement & Inspection (M&I)
 Metallic Materials Manufacturing (MMM)
 Nonconventional Machining and Surface Enhancement (NMSE)
 Nondestructive Testing (NDT)
 Non Metallic Materials Manufacturing (NMMM)
 Non Metallic Materials Testing (NMMT)
 Sealants (SLT)
 Welding (WLD)

The Nadcap program and industry
PRI schedules an audit and assigns an industry approved auditor who will conduct the audit using an industry agreed checklist. At the end of the audit, any non-conformity issues will be raised through a non-conformance report. PRI will administer and close out the non-conformance reports with the Supplier. Upon completion PRI will present the audit pack to a 'special process Task Group’ made up of members from industry who will review it and vote on its acceptability for approval.

The Nadcap subscribers include:
 309th Maintenance Wing-Hill AFB
 Aerojet Rocketdyne
 Airbus Group - Airbus
 Airbus Group - Airbus Defence and Space
 Airbus Group - Airbus Helicopters
 Airbus Group - Premium AEROTEC GmbH
 Airbus Group - Stelia Aerospace
 Air Force
 BAE Systems Military Air Information (MAI)
 BAE Systems
 The Boeing Company
 Bombardier Inc.
 COMAC
 Defense Contract Management Agency (DCMA)
 Eaton, Aerospace Group
 Embraer S.A.
 GE Aviation
 GE Aviation - GE Avio S.r.l.
 General Dynamics - Gulfstream
 GKN Aerospace
 GKN Aerospace Sweden AB
 Harris Corporation
 Heroux-Devtek Landing Gear Division Inc.
 Honeywell Aerospace
 Israel Aerospace Industries
 Latécoère
 Leonardo S.p.A. Divisione Velivoli
 Leonardo S.p.A. – Helicopter Division
 Liebherr-Aerospace SAS
 Lockheed Martin Corporation
 Lockheed Martin - Sikorsky Aircraft
 Mitsubishi Aircraft Corporation
 Mitsubishi Heavy Industries LTD
 MTU Aero Engines AG
 NASA
 Northrop Grumman Corporation
 Parker Aerospace Group
 Raytheon Company
 Raytheon Technologies  - Goodrich 
 Raytheon Technologies  - Collins Aerospace (Hamilton Sundstrand)
 Raytheon Technologies  - Pratt & Whitney
 Raytheon Technologies - Pratt & Whitney Canada
 Raytheon Technologies - Collins Aerospace (Rockwell Collins)
 Rolls-Royce
 SAFRAN Group
 Singapore Technologies Aerospace
 Sonaca
 Spirit AeroSystems
 Swift Engineering
 Textron Inc. - Textron Aviation
 Textron Inc. - Bell Helicopter
 Thales Group
 Triumph Group Inc.
 Zodiac Aerospace (SAFRAN)

Nadcap Meetings
Nadcap meetings are held several times a year in different locations worldwide. For example, the 2017 meetings were held in New Orleans, LA, USA in February, Berlin (Germany) in June; and Pittsburgh (Pennsylvania). During these meetings there are open Task Group meetings and other workshops (with participation of Primes, Suppliers, and PRI staff). These meetings are used to discuss the program development and changes to audit criteria among other topics. Agendas and minutes are posted on the PRI website.

Nadcap Training
During the Nadcap meetings, training classes are provided on different topics such as:
 Root Cause Corrective Action - RCCA
 Special processes, such as, NDT, chemical processing, etc.
 Internal auditing
 AS/EN/JISQ 9100
 Problem Solving Tools
 Nadcap Audit Preparation – Chemical Processing
 Nadcap Audit Preparation – Heat Treating
 Nadcap Audit Preparation – Metallic Material Testing Laboratories
 Nadcap Audit Preparation – Non-Destructive Testing
 Nadcap Audit Preparation – Welding

References

External links
 
 Boeing official site
 ADS Group official site
 Aerospace Manufacturing
 Quality Manufacturing Today

Aerospace engineering